Cuvok is an Afro-Asiatic language spoken in northern Cameroon.

Cuvok is spoken by about 5,000 speakers (ALCAM 1983) in and around Tchouvok, near Zamay (Mokolo commune, Mayo-Tsanaga department), Far North Region. Cuvok is about as closely related to Mefele (especially the Muhura dialect) as North Mofu is to South Mofu.

Notes

References 

 

Biu-Mandara languages
Languages of Cameroon